Uronema elegans is a species of ciliates in the family Uronematidae. It is found in Norway.

References

External links 

 
 Uronema elegans at the World Register of Marine Species (WoRMS)

Species described in 1911
Philasterida